Paarijatham (English: Night Flowering Jasmine) was a popular Malayalam soap opera, broadcast on Asianet from October 2008 to April 2011 on weekdays at 7:30 PM IST. It replaced the first season of Hello Kuttichathan series by Baiju Devaraj.

The series was a major success in Malayalam television, with 663 episodes. This was a production by Sandra Communications after the success of Ente Manasaputhri on the same channel. Popular Malayalam television actress Rasna made her debut in this series which had Arun Ghosh and South Indian actress Aishwariyaa Bhaskaran in lead roles.

The series has been remade in Tamil under the same title with Rasna essaying the lead role, which aired on Star Vijay. The serial was also made in Kannada with the same title on Asianet Suvarna.

The show retelecasted on Asianet Plus on 21 March 2016, featuring its past episodes.

Plot
The story revolves around identical twin sisters, Aruna and Seema, who are poles apart. They come from a middle-class family. Aruna is a shy, simple, down-to-earth and soft-spoken girl, whereas Seema is bold, daring, modern and outgoing. Seema is more educated than Aruna. Aruna dreams of a simple married life with a loving husband, but Seema wants an extremely rich husband, who can provide her a luxurious life with all the riches.

Jayapal is the son of a business magnate, Gangadhara Menon, and is heir to millions, but he is an arrogant, spoiled womaniser. Aruna works in the town, while Seema is unemployed and enjoys life. Seema likes Jayapal because he is wealthy, but Jayapal falls in love with Aruna. He does not know that Seema and Aruna are twins.

Jayapal proposes to Aruna and they decide to marry, but Jayapal's stepmother, Lalitha Bai, poisons Jayapal's mind against Aruna and stops him from marrying her. Meanwhile, Seema marries Mohan, a friendly and nice man. Later, under dire circumstances, Jayapal and Aruna are forced to marry each other. Aruna still loves Jayapal, but he hates her and has turned into a drunk womaniser again. Jayapal and Lalitha abuse and torture the meek Aruna, until Seema in disguise as Aruna fights back. The story is about how Aruna wins back Jayapal's love and reforms him with the help of her sister Seema and father-in-law Gangadhara Menon. Lalitha Bai is put out of the house.

Later, Aruna and Jayapal have a son, Chandru. Seema and Mohan have a daughter, Haritha. Aruna and her son are arrogant because of their wealthy lifestyle but later reform. Lalitha Bai uses Chandru to get back into JP's house. Then a series of plots and melodrama begins again. She puts the whole family in trouble by making Chandru a spoiled brat. After so many fights between Seema and Lalitha Bai, Seema wins at last. Lalitha Bai is suffering from cancer and is fighting death. In the climax, Lalitha Bai becomes good but dies while Aruna gives birth to her second child.

Cast 
 Rasna as Seema Mohan / Aruna Jayapal (Double role)
 Arun Ghosh as Jayapal a.k.a. JP
 Aishwariyaa Bhaskaran as Lalitha Bai a.k.a. Auntyamma
 Ravi Vallathol as Gangadhara Menon
 Shaju Sreedhar as Mohan
 Srihari as Ayyappan
 Vijayakumari as Bharathi
 Ambika Mohan as Mohan's mother
 Mahesh as Unnithan
 Maneesh Krishna as Balan
 Subash Menon as Soman
 Sree Lakshmi as Jolly
 Priya Mohan
 Prajusha as Susan
 Manu Nair
 Rekha Krishnappa
 Deepika Mohan 
 Sreelatha Menon
 K. P. A. C. Leelamani

Awards

Asianet Television Awards 2011
 Best Serial
 Best Actor: Arun Ghosh
 Best Actress: Rasna
 Special Jury Award for Actor: Ravi Vallathol
 Best Actress in a Negative Role: Aishwariyaa Bhaskaran

References 

Indian television series
Asianet (TV channel) original programming
Indian television soap operas
Serial drama television series
Malayalam-language television shows